The XtremeAir Sbach 342 (XA42) is a German high performance two-seat aerobatic and touring monoplane designed by Philipp Steinbach with Albert Mylius and built by XtremeAir GmbH of Hecklingen.

The Sbach 342 (a marketing name for the XA42) is a composite structure low-wing monoplane with a fixed conventional landing gear with a tailwheel and carbon fiber fuselage. It is powered by a  Lycoming AEIO-580-B1A piston engine driving a three-bladed propeller. It is the tandem version of the single-seater XA 41 (XtremeAir Sbach 300) which was designed by the same team in Speyer in 2004. The XA42 received a type certificate from the European Aviation Safety Agency in March 2011. In November 2012 it received its type certification through the FAA.

The production of this plane was stopped at the beginning of the year 2021

Specifications (acrobatic)

References

Notes

External links

 XtremeAir GmbH - company website

2000s German sport aircraft
Aerobatic aircraft
Single-engined tractor aircraft
Low-wing aircraft
Aircraft first flown in 2008
Conventional landing gear